Holter may refer to:

 Holter monitor,ambulatory health monitor
 Holter (surname)